The Shack or The Hut (Spanish: La barraca) is an 1898 novel by the Spanish writer Vicente Blasco Ibáñez. Its English translation sold over a million copies.

It was adapted into a 1945 Mexican film The Shack.

References

Bibliography
 Martha Eulalia Altisent. A Companion to the Twentieth-century Spanish Novel. Boydell & Brewer Ltd, 2008.

1898 novels
19th-century Spanish novels
Spanish novels adapted into films